Johnny Arthur "John" Kramer (born December 15, 1956 in Camp LeJeune, North Carolina) is an American former professional darts player who competes members in British Darts Organisation in the 1980s.

Before darts
Kramer started playing darts in 1974 in the weight room at his high school while recovering from a knee injury sustained during a high school football game. John quickly discovered he had a knack for the game and played his first professional tournament in Ventura, California the weekend after graduation in 1975.

Darts success
John enjoyed much success during his playing days from 1975 through 1987, including his first North American Open singles title, where he defeated world #3 ranked player, Jocky Wilson in the semi-final and the #1 player in the world at that time, Eric Bristow in the final. In 1982 he competed in the 1982 World Darts Championship but was defeated by the English darts player Tony Brown in the first round. His national ranking in 1985 earned him a spot on the US World Cup team to compete in Brisbane, Australia. The US won the team gold medal at World Cup V, which saw them defeat the English team 9-0, before going on to defeat the Australian team to win the gold medal. The US team also brought home the Silver medal for their 2nd-place finish overall. 1985 brought John to the US#1 ranking and his first Bulls-Eye News magazine cover.
1987 was when he first retired from the game due to personal reasons and John enjoyed his spare time playing tournament and league softball.
1999 saw a resurgence of John’s darting career after a 12-year absence, where he enjoyed many successes, including a second North American Open singles title (defeating US player Roger Carter), being part of the rare accomplishment of winning both Open Doubles events at the Las Vegas Open (with Chris White) in 2001, and a second Bulls-Eye News magazine cover.
2002 brought on a second retirement from darts and his venture into tournament paintball.
2006 has brought on another resurgence into darts.  Enjoying more success at events such as the Wild West Shootout and the San Francisco Open with Open Cricket singles titles for both.
2007 added some semi-final and finals, but the quest for the perfect dart showed in the finishes.
2008 saw an Open Singles Champion for the San Diego Memorial Open.

2009 was a quiet year and 2010 brought on some very severe health issues, which left 2011 for John to pretty much learn how to throw a dart all over again. With lots more ability to travel to compete at tournaments in 2012, John has seen big improvements in his game.

John has  moved to the east coast of the US and is now able to compete more often at the tournament level. John finished 2012 ranked in the top 30 in the US according to the national rankings for the American Darts Organization, and as of March 2013, is ranked at #6 in the national rankings.

John began 2013 with a new sponsor, the Puma Darts Company out of New Zealand as a Shot! Ambassador.

In 2017, John has been living in Cary, North Carolina for two years and competing locally in leagues and different events. He is not currently sponsored and not traveling to tournaments at this time. He continues to be one of the top leaders in the leagues of the area in winning percentages and averages.

World Championship results

BDO
 1982: Last 32: (lost to Tony Brown 0–2) (sets)

Tournament results

External links
John Kramer's Stats at Darts Database

1956 births
American darts players
Living people
British Darts Organisation players
Sportspeople from North Carolina